Paikiniana is a genus of Asian dwarf spiders that was first described by K. Y. Eskov in 1992.

Species
 it contains ten species:
Paikiniana bella (Paik, 1978) (type) – Korea
Paikiniana biceps Song & Li, 2008 – China
Paikiniana furcata Zhao & Li, 2014 – China
Paikiniana iriei (Ono, 2007) – Japan
Paikiniana keikoae (Saito, 1988) – Japan
Paikiniana lurida (Seo, 1991) – Korea, Japan
Paikiniana mikurana Ono, 2010 – Japan
Paikiniana mira (Oi, 1960) – China, Korea, Japan
Paikiniana operta Irfan & Peng, 2018 – China
Paikiniana vulgaris (Oi, 1960) – Korea, Japan

See also
 List of Linyphiidae species (I–P)

References

Araneomorphae genera
Linyphiidae
Spiders of Asia